Acronicta spinea is a species of moth in the family Noctuidae (the owlet moths).

The MONA or Hodges number for Acronicta spinea is 9276.

References

Further reading

 
 
 

Acronicta
Articles created by Qbugbot
Moths described in 1876